Dallas Willsmore (born 29 May 1995) is a former professional Australian rules footballer who played for the Hawthorn Football Club in the Australian Football League.

Dallas Willsmore hails from the small Mallee township of Underbool, Victoria
Willsmore was drafted by Hawthorn with their first selection and seventeenth overall in the 2014 rookie draft.

A tall and versatile wingman, Willsmore has spent four years in the system before making his debut against Sydney on the SCG.

He was delisted by Hawthorn at the conclusion of the 2017. Hawthorn would re-rookie him with pick 34 in the 2018 AFL rookie draft. 

Willsmore played the 2018 season with Box Hill, failing to break into the Hawthorn senior side, he kicked an important goal in the 2018 VFL Grand Final.

Following the 2018 season, Willsmore was delisted again. It is speculated that Dallas will return to home club of Ouyen United in the 2019 season, alongside partner Sarah Smith.

Statistics

|- style=background:#EAEAEA
| 2014 ||  || 43
| 0 || — || — || — || — || — || — || — || — || — || — || — || — || — || — || 0
|-
| 2015 ||  || 43
| 0 || — || — || — || — || — || — || — || — || — || — || — || — || — || — || 0
|- style=background:#EAEAEA
| 2016 ||  || 20
| 0 || — || — || — || — || — || — || — || — || — || — || — || — || — || — || 0
|- 
| 2017 ||  || 20
| 2 || 0 || 0 || 12 || 7 || 19 || 9 || 7 || 0.0 || 0.0 || 6.0 || 3.5 || 9.5 || 4.5 || 3.5 || 0
|- style=background:#EAEAEA
| 2018 ||  || 20
| 0 || — || — || — || — || — || — || — || — || — || — || — || — || — || — || 0
|- class="sortbottom"
! colspan=3| Career
! 2 !! 0 !! 0 !! 12 !! 7 !! 19 !! 9 !! 7 !! 0.0 !! 0.0 !! 6.0 !! 3.5 !! 9.5 !! 4.5 !! 3.5 !! 0
|}

Honours and achievements
Team
 VFL premiership player: 2018
 Minor premiership: 2015

References

External links

Living people
1995 births
Australian rules footballers from Victoria (Australia)
Box Hill Football Club players
Hawthorn Football Club players